The year 1889 in art involved some significant events.

Events
 February 2 – Sixth annual exhibition of Les XX opens in Brussels, including the first important display of Paul Gauguin's work.
 May 6 – October 31 – Exposition Universelle in Paris, with the Eiffel Tower as its entrance arch.
 May 8 – Van Gogh moves from Arles to the Saint-Paul asylum in Saint-Rémy-de-Provence.
 June – The Volpini Exhibition: Exposition de peintures du Groupe impressioniste et synthétiste, faite dans le local de M. Volpini au Champ-de-Mars organised by Paul Gauguin and Émile Schuffenecker at the Café des Arts in Paris; other exhibitors include Émile Bernard and Charles Laval.
 July 15 – The Scottish National Portrait Gallery opens in Edinburgh in premises designed by Rowand Anderson, the first in the world to be purpose-built as a portrait gallery.
 July 23 – Marie Triepcke marries fellow-artist Peder Severin Krøyer in Augsburg.
 August 17 – The 9 by 5 Impression Exhibition opens in Melbourne, Australia.
 Edvard Munch stages his first one-man exhibition and wins a state scholarship to study in Paris.
 Alfred Sisley settles at Moret-sur-Loing.
 The Skulpturensammlung moves into the Albertinum in Dresden.
 The Imperial Museum of Nara is established in Japan.

Works

 Jean Béraud - La Pâtisserie Gloppe
 Pierre Bonnard – Self-portrait (approx. date)
 William-Adolphe Bouguereau
 Première rêverie
 The Shepherdess
 Antoine Bourdelle – Adam
 Henry Jamyn Brooks – Private View of the Old Masters Exhibition, Royal Academy, 1888
 Milly Childers – Self-portrait 
 Henry de Groux – Christ aux Outrages
 Thomas Eakins – The Agnew Clinic
 Paul Gustav Fischer – The Royal Theatre Ballet School, Copenhagen
 Stanhope Forbes – The Health of the Bride
 Henry Justice Ford – Illustrations to Andrew Lang's The Blue Fairy Book
 Louis Édouard Fournier – The Funeral of Shelley
 Paul Gauguin
 The Green Christ and The Yellow Christ (Pont-Aven, c. September)
 Portrait of Jacob Meijer de Haan (Le Pouldu, after October 2)
 Self-Portrait with Halo and Snake (Le Pouldu, after October 2)
 The Flageolet Player on the Cliff (Le Pouldu)
 Alfred Gilbert – Marble bust of Queen Victoria
 J. W. Godward
 Grecian Reverie
 His Birthday Gift
 Ianthe
 Waiting For An Answer
 Félix Resurrección Hidalgo – La Parisienne
 Jozef Israëls – A Son of the Ancient Race (several versions)
 Juan Luna – Hymen o Hymenee
 Frederick McCubbin – Down on His Luck
 Arturo Michelena – La Joven Madre ("The Young Mother")
 Claude Monet – Valley of the Creuse series
 Edvard Munch
 Inger on the Beach, Summer Night
 Music on Karl Johan Street
 Spring
 Blanche Nevin – Peter Muhlenberg (marble)
 Eilif Peterssen – Salmon Fishermen at Nesøya
 Ilya Repin – Portrait of Baroness Varvara Ivanovna Ikskul von Hildenbandt
 Auguste Rodin – The Burghers of Calais (sculpture)
 John Singer Sargent
 Gabriel Fauré
 Ellen Terry as Lady Macbeth
 Lady Fishing - Mrs Ormond
 An Out-of-Doors Study
 Henryk Siemiradzki – Phryne at the Poseidonia in Eleusis
 Arthur Streeton – Golden Summer, Eaglemont
 Franz Stuck – The Guardian of Paradise
 Vincent van Gogh
 Hospital in Arles series
 Garden of the Hospital in Arles (June)
 Ward in the Hospital in Arles (October)
 Portrait of Doctor Félix Rey (January)
 Self-portrait and Self-Portrait with Bandaged Ear (January)
 Self-Portrait as a sick person (Saint-Rémy, August)
 Bedroom in Arles (second and third versions, September)
 View of Arles, Flowering Orchards and View of Arles with Trees in Blossom (Spring)
 Butterflies series (Spring)
 Irises
 Rain (Saint-Rémy, October/November)
 The Ravine of the Peyroulets
 A Road at Saint-Remy with Female Figure
 The Starry Night (Saint-Rémy, June)
 Saint-Paul Asylum, Saint-Rémy series
 Trees and Undergrowth series
 Portrait of Trabuc, an Attendant at Saint-Paul Hospital and Portrait of Madame Trabuc (Saint-Rémy, September)
 Two Crabs (c. January)
 Wheat Fields series
 Wheat Field, Sunrise (Saint-Rémy)
 Wheat Field with Cypresses (three paintings, Saint-Rémy, July–September)
 Peasant Woman Binding Sheaves (after Millet) 
 Carl von Marr – The Flagellants
 Fritz von Uhde – Heathland princess
 Édouard Vuillard – Self-portrait
 John Quincy Adams Ward – Bust of Alexander Lyman Holley (bronze, New York City)

Births
 January 19 – Sophie Taeuber-Arp, Swiss geometric abstract painter, sculptor and dancer (died 1943)
 January 21 – Hermann Glöckner, German Constructivist painter and sculptor (died 1987)
 April 15 – Thomas Hart Benton, American painter and muralist (died 1975)
 May 11 – Paul Nash, English painter (died 1946)
 June – James Sleator, Irish painter (died 1950)
 July 31 – Júlíana Sveinsdóttir, Icelandic painter and textile artist (died 1966)
 August 13 – Christopher R. W. Nevinson, English war artist (died 1946)
 August 20 – David Kakabadze, Georgian artist (died 1952)
 September 28 – Seán Keating, Irish romantic-realist painter (died 1977)
 October 10 – Han van Meegeren, Dutch painter and art forger (died 1947)
 October 17 – Karl Völker, German painter and architect (died 1962)
 October 29 – Edward Wadsworth, English painter (died 1949)
 November 1 – Hannah Höch, German Dada photomontage artist (died 1978) 
 November 10 – Clive Stephen, Australian sculptor (died 1957)

Deaths
 January 23 – Alexandre Cabanel, painter (born 1823)
 February 5 – James Smetham, pre-Raphaelite painter (born 1821)
 February 24 – Philip Henry Delamotte, photographer and illustrator (born 1821)
 May 23 – John O'Connor, painter (born 1830)
 October 6 – Jules Dupré, painter (born 1811)
 December 27 – Eduard Bendemann, painter (born 1811)
 date unknown – Jules Tavernier, French painter (born 1844)

References

 
Years of the 19th century in art
1880s in art